The Motorsport Arena Oschersleben is a  long race track with a width of  and elevation changes of . Its fairly flat contours create a smooth, fast circuit.

Opened on 25 July 1997 as Motopark Oschersleben, it was Germany's fourth permanent racecourse, after Nürburgring, Hockenheimring and Sachsenring.

Motorsport Arena Oschersleben was a venue for FIA's European Touring Car Championship from 2001 to 2004 and the World Touring Car Championship from 2005 to 2011.

The circuit
Consistently driving quickly is hard work on the fast and smooth circuit. The first turn, modified from its original rounded shape into a sharp 90-degree left, is a frequent source of multi-car accidents especially on the first lap, as a popular YouTube video of a touring race illustrates this case, with former BTCC driver-turned commentator John Cleland remarking that, "The guy who designed this first corner should be taken into a dark room and beat about the head". There are many key turns to master for a fast lap. The end of the finish straight is the fastest spot on the circuit. The McDonald's chicane allows for different racing lines. However, an aggressive line may lead to early retirement with broken suspension.

Lap records 

The fastest official race lap records at the Motorsport Arena Oschersleben are listed as:

Events 

 Current

 April: TCR Eastern Europe Trophy, ACCR Formula 4 Championship
 May: Deutsche Tourenwagen Masters, Preis der Stadt Magdeburg
 June: IDM Superbike Championship
 July: ADAC Racing Weekend Oschersleben
 September: NASCAR Whelen Euro Series NASCAR GP Germany
 October: Sidecar World Championship Sidecar Festival

 Former

 ADAC Formula 4 (2015–2020)
 ADAC GT Masters (2007–2022)
 Auto GP (2011)
 EuroBOSS Series (2006)
 European Touring Car Championship (2001–2004)
 FIA GT Championship (1998–1999, 2002–2009)
 FIA Sportscar Championship (2003)
 FIM Endurance World Championship 8 Hours of Oschersleben (1999–2009, 2012–2019)
 Formula Renault Eurocup (2004–2005)
 Formula Three Euroseries (2005–2006, 2009–2010)
 International Formula 3000 (1998)
 International GT Open (2007)
 Superbike World Championship (2000–2004)
 Super Tourenwagen Cup (1998–1999)
 TCR Europe Touring Car Series (2019)
 TCR International Series (2016–2017)
 World Touring Car Championship FIA WTCC Race of Germany (2005–2011)

References

External links 

 
 Map and circuit history at RacingCircuits.info
 Onboard qualifying lap on a Superbike
 Motorsport Arena Oschersleben in Google Maps
 Free audio walkthrough of the track, for use with games

Motorsport Arena Oschersleben
Oschersleben
Motorsport Arena Oschersleben
Motorsport Arena Oschersleben
Oschersleben